Glow TV is a South African channel that shows Indian shows. It was launched in October 2013. The channel originally aired Hindi shows and soon began dubbing in English. It broadcasts series such as This is Love, True Love and Young Love. The channel offers a variety of programming from other brands such as colors tv

History
The channel launched through Urban Brew Studios from 13 October 2013 on Openview and was later added onto DStv and StarSat. In 2018, it was removed from DStv. On the 1st of October 2021 it was abruptly removed from the Openview platform.

However, Glow TV immediately launched a court application and was added back to the platform on the 19th of October after the High Court instructed Openview to do so.

Programs

Current shows
 This is Love (Rerun) 
 True Love (Rerun)
 Young love(Rerun)
 A Touch of Love
 The Power Of Love

References

External links 
 

2013 establishments in South Africa
Television stations in South Africa
South African Indian mass media